Unaffiliated, meaning a lack of affiliation, may refer to:
Independent politician or unaffiliated politician
Independent voter or unaffiliated voter
Unaffiliated (New Jersey), a status for registered voters in New Jersey

See also
Apolitical, a lack of any political affiliation
Irreligion, a lack of any religious affiliation
Nonpartisanism, a lack of affiliation to a political party
Affiliation (disambiguation)